Goodnight Oslo is the sixteenth studio album by Robyn Hitchcock, and his second with The Venus 3. Recorded with Peter Buck of R.E.M., Scott McCaughey of Young Fresh Fellows and Bill Rieflin of Ministry and R.E.M., who are billed collectively as The Venus 3. Colin Meloy of The Decemberists provided one of the backup vocals in "Saturday Groovers", as  Hitchcock provided guitar for a track on the Decemberists' album The Hazards of Love.

Track list
"What You Is" (Hitchcock)  – 3:26
"Your Head Here" (Hitchcock)  – 3:48
"Saturday Groovers" (Hitchcock)  – 2:48
"I'm Falling" (Hitchcock)  – 4:34
"Hurry for the Sky" (Hitchcock) - 3:11
"Sixteen Years" (Hitchcock, Peter Buck)  – 4:24
"Up to Our Nex" (Hitchcock)  – 3:47
"Intricate Thing" (Hitchcock)  – 3:31
"TLC" (Hitchcock)  – 3:46
"Goodnight Oslo" (Hitchcock)  – 6:01

References

Robyn Hitchcock albums
2009 albums
Yep Roc Records albums